Safety Not Guaranteed is a 2012 American comedy film directed by Colin Trevorrow and starring Aubrey Plaza and Mark Duplass. The picture was screened at the 2012 Sundance Film Festival, where it won the Waldo Salt Screenwriting Award. The film was inspired by a joke classified ad that ran in Backwoods Home Magazine in 1997.

Plot
Darius Britt is an intelligent but disillusioned graduate of the University of Washington who lives at home in Seattle with her widower father and works as an intern at Seattle Magazine. One of the magazine's writers, Jeff Schwensen, proposes to investigate a newspaper classified ad that reads:

Jeff's boss Bridget approves of his story idea and Jeff selects his team: Darius and Arnau, a studious UW student interning at the magazine to diversify his résumé for medical school applications. They travel to the seaside community of Ocean View to find and profile the person who wrote the ad. Jeff's ulterior motive for this out-of-town assignment is to track down his long-lost love interest who lives in town.

Darius discovers the ad was placed by Kenneth Calloway, a stock clerk at a local grocery store. Jeff's attempt to approach Kenneth alienates him, so Jeff orders Darius to make contact. Darius' disaffected attitude serves her well, and she quickly endears herself to Kenneth as she poses as a candidate to accompany him on his mission. While Kenneth is paranoid and believes secret agents are tracking his every move, Darius gains his trust as she participates in a series of training exercises in the woods around his house and she begins to develop feelings for him. She tells Kenneth about losing her mother when she was young and her mission is to prevent her mother's death. Kenneth says his mission is to go back to 2001 and prevent the death of his old girlfriend, Belinda, who was killed when someone drove a car into her house.

Meanwhile, Jeff tracks down Liz, a fling from his teenage years. Although she is not as attractive as he recalls, they reconnect and sleep together. He asks her to come back with him to Seattle, but she believes this is just another fling for him, so she refuses. Upset by her rejection, Jeff takes Arnau out on the town and they pick up some young women. Jeff tells Arnau to not waste his youth and convinces him to spend the night with one of the women.

The next morning, Jeff receives a phone call from Bridget, who has been following up the team's notes on the story. She informs Jeff that Belinda is still alive and lives an hour away from where they are. During an interview, Darius learns Belinda was only friends with Kenneth and Kenneth actually was the one who drove into her then-boyfriend's house, yet no one was injured. After the interview, Darius is questioned by two government agents who have been following Kenneth and believe that he may be a spy because of his communication with government scientists. They know Kenneth has been breaking into labs and stealing equipment.

Darius returns to Kenneth's house to confront him, but Kenneth rationalizes Belinda is now alive because his time travel mission succeeded. Jeff runs in to warn them that the government agents are also on the property. Kenneth panics and runs into the woods. Darius follows Kenneth, who has boarded his time machine, which has been integrated into a small boat on the lake. Darius apologizes for lying to Kenneth, tells him everything else they shared was real, and joins him on the boat. Kenneth tells Darius that his mission is now only to go back for her. Jeff, Arnau, and the agents watch as Kenneth and Darius activate the time machine and vanish. A filmed interview, presumably from earlier, shows Kenneth explaining why he chose to enlist a partner for his time travels.

Cast
 Aubrey Plaza as Darius Britt
 Mark Duplass as Kenneth Calloway
 Jake Johnson as Jeff Schwensen
 Karan Soni as Arnau
 Jenica Bergere as Liz
 Mary Lynn Rajskub as Bridget
 Kristen Bell as Belinda
 Jeff Garlin as Darius's father
 William Hall Jr. as Shannon

Production
In the September/October 1997 issue of Backwoods Home, Senior Editor John Silveira wrote a joke ad as filler for the magazine's classified ad section:

This issue of the magazine also featured a fake personals ad using the same post office box, Silveria's own mailing address, which Silveria thought would give away the joke. However, the "Safety Not Guaranteed" ad became a cultural phenomenon. The address received thousands of letters in response to the time travel ad. The ad was featured on The Tonight Show with Jay Leno and discussed repeatedly on the Car Talk radio series.

Conolly came across references to the ad in 2007, and initially assumed it was genuine: “There was something really sad about it all. What if he is really lamenting something from his past that he wants to go back and fix. That’s what drew my attention.” Conolly wrote a first draft of the script as a buddy comedy but later re-wrote the lead role with Plaza in mind, after seeing her performance in Funny People. Wanting to gain permission of the ad's writer to adapt the concept into a film, Conolly eventually tracked down Silviera who gave his blessing.

The film was shot in Seattle and Ocean Shores, Washington, and other locations within 30 miles of Seattle. It is also partially set in Seattle. The film was shot with a Sony F3 camera using old Panavision lenses, which gave the film a desired "Hal Ashby look" for director Colin Trevorrow. Production budget was reported by The Film Collaborative to be $750,000. Duplass and his brother Jay received executive producer credit.

Critical reception

Safety Not Guaranteed has a 91% approval rating on Rotten Tomatoes based on reviews from 150 critics; the average rating is 7.40/10. The site's critical consensus states: "Safety Not Guaranteeds ostensibly modest ambitions are outmatched by the movie's strong performances, beguiling charm, and heartfelt story." Metacritic gives the film a score of 72 out of 100 based on reviews from 31 critics, indicating "generally favorable reviews".

Stephen Holden of The New York Times wrote that the story's shenanigans are "harnessed to a plaintive underlying theme about the fading dreams of those aspiring professionals in their 20s and 30s." Roger Ebert praised the film for the quality of the dialogue, characters with depth and dimension, as well as Mark Duplass for his balanced performance.

Safety Not Guaranteed has been called "one of the most influential films of the last decade" in terms of its effect on the film making industry.  Made in 2012 with a first-time director and writer and costing less than a million dollars, this character-driven indie caught the eye of Netflix, foreshadowing the role of streaming in film creation and distribution and of such directors being tapped to direct big-budget films due to their experience with well-regarded small-budget films.

Awards

References

External links
 
 
 
 

2012 films
2012 romantic comedy films
2010s science fiction comedy films
American romantic comedy films
American coming-of-age films
Films set in Seattle
Films shot in Washington (state)
Films shot in Seattle
American independent films
Films about time travel
FilmDistrict films
Films directed by Colin Trevorrow
Big Beach (company) films
Duplass Brothers Productions films
American science fiction comedy films
Films with screenplays by Derek Connolly
2012 independent films
2010s English-language films
2010s American films